Slađan Mijatović (born 23 May 1994) is a Serbian football defender, playing for Bačka.

Club career
Mijatović has started playing in football school "VUK", and later moved to OFK Beograd youth academy. He started his senior career in the Serbian League Belgrade side Dorćol, and later he also played with Železnik. In the winter break off-season 2013–14, he signed with Jagodina. He made his professional debut for Jagodina in Serbian SuperLiga home match versus Red Star Belgrade on 1 March 2014. During the time he played under contract with Jagodina, Mijatović was loaned on dual registration with the satellite club Tabane Trgovački. In 2017, he terminated a contract with Jagodina and left the club as a free agent. Later he moved to Jedinstvo Paraćin.

References

External links
 
 Slađan Mijatović stats at Utakmica.rs

1994 births
Living people
People from Paraćin
Association football defenders
Serbian footballers
FK Dorćol players
FK Železnik players
FK Jagodina players
OFK Žarkovo players
FK Radnički 1923 players
OFK Bačka players
Serbian First League players
Serbian SuperLiga players